Rogelio Rivas (born 7 August 1944) is a Spanish sprinter. He competed in the men's 100 metres at the 1964 Summer Olympics.

References

1944 births
Living people
Athletes (track and field) at the 1964 Summer Olympics
Spanish male sprinters
Olympic athletes of Spain
Mediterranean Games silver medalists for Spain
Mediterranean Games medalists in athletics
Sportspeople from Vigo
Athletes (track and field) at the 1967 Mediterranean Games